The Southern Liang (397–404, 408–414) was a dynastic state of China listed as one of the Sixteen Kingdoms in Chinese historiography. Members of the ruling Tufa clan were of Xianbei ethnicity and distant relatives of the Tuoba imperial house of the Northern Wei dynasty. According to the Book of Jin, the surname of the ruling house was changed from Tuoba to Tufa because one of the Tufa ancestors was born on a blanket, and in the Xianbei language, "Tufa" meant "blanket."

All rulers of the Southern Liang proclaimed themselves wang (king).

In 414 Southern Liang was conquered by the Xianbei-led Western Qin dynasty.

Rulers of the Southern Liang

The family tree of Southern Liang rulers

See also
Dunhuang
Wu Hu
List of past Chinese ethnic groups
Qinghai
Sixteen Kingdoms
Tuoba
Xianbei

References

 
Dynasties in Chinese history
Former countries in Chinese history
397 establishments
410s disestablishments
4th-century establishments in China
5th-century disestablishments in China